Tarot Sport is the second studio album by Fuck Buttons, produced by Andrew Weatherall. It was released on 14 October 2009 in the UK and on 20 October in the US. It peaked at number 79 on the UK Albums Chart.

Critical reception

Tarot Sport was met with positive critical reviews, earning a score of 84 out of 100 on review aggregator Metacritic based on 21 professional reviews. Andrzej Lukowski of Drowned in Sound wrote that "If it doesn't necessarily resonate with the times, it ought to resonate by dint of sheer, joyous momentum." With a score of 8.3, it is also an AnyDecentMusic? Chart Topper.

Accolades
 11th – Pitchfork
 21st – Rhapsody

Track listing

Personnel
Credits adapted from liner notes.

 Fuck Buttons – music
 Andrew Weatherall – production
 Steve Boardman – engineering, additional programming
 Bob Weston – mastering
 Benjamin John Power – artwork
 Lucy Johnston – photography

Charts

References

External links
 

2009 albums
Fuck Buttons albums
ATP Recordings albums
Albums produced by Andrew Weatherall